Cherry Lake is a lake in South Dakota, in the United States.

The lake was named for the abundant growth of chokecherries at the site.

See also
List of lakes in South Dakota

References

Lakes of South Dakota
Lakes of Clark County, South Dakota
Lakes of Kingsbury County, South Dakota